Fernandina Beach High School is a public high school located in Fernandina Beach, Florida. It is part of the Nassau County School District and serves grades 9 through 12. Chris Webber is the school's principal. For athletics, the school's colors are blue and gold and its teams' nickname is the "Pirates".

Notable alumni
 Terrence Flagler, former NFL player
 Clint Crisher, American singer-songwriter

References

External links
 Fernandina Beach High School Home Page

Public high schools in Florida
High schools in Nassau County, Florida
Fernandina Beach, Florida